Cooleewahee Creek is a stream in the U.S. state of Georgia. It is a tributary to the Flint River.

According to tradition, Cooleewahee is a name derived from the Muskogee language translating to "where the white oak acorns are scattered".

References

Rivers of Georgia (U.S. state)
Rivers of Baker County, Georgia
Rivers of Dougherty County, Georgia